Alfredo Furia (16 June 1906 – 9 November 1936) was an Italian male steeplechase runner who competed at the 1932 Summer Olympics.

References

External links
 

1906 births
1936 deaths
Athletes (track and field) at the 1932 Summer Olympics
Italian male steeplechase runners
Olympic athletes of Italy